The Concordia Stingers are the athletic teams that represent Concordia University in Montreal, Quebec, Canada.  They compete with other schools in Canadian Interuniversity Sport, and more specifically in Réseau du sport étudiant du Québec (RSEQ; French for "Quebec Student Sports Network"). The Stingers were established in 1974 when Sir George Williams University and Loyola College merged to form Concordia University and replaced the preceding Sir George Williams Georgians and Loyola Warriors.

The university has 10 varsity teams - football, men's and women's soccer, men's and women's rugby, wrestling, men's and women's hockey and men's and women's basketball.

Varsity teams

Football (M)
Basketball (M/W)
Hockey (M/W)
Rugby (M/W)
Soccer (M/W)
Wrestling (M/W)

Football

The Concordia Stingers football team is currently coached by Brad Collinson and plays home games at the Concordia Stadium. The Stingers appeared in one Vanier Cup national championship in 1998, but lost to the Saskatchewan Huskies. The Stingers won the Dunsmore Cup three times, but have lost each of the last five times they have appeared in the Quebec title game.

Basketball
The men's basketball team is coached by Rastko Popovic, and the women's basketball team by Tenicha
Gittens.
John Dore was a former coach.

Women's ice hockey

Rugby
In November 2005, Concordia's rugby team came from behind to beat McGill 20–18 at the Percival Molson Stadium to take the men's rugby provincial championship—the school's first since 2001.

The women's rugby team is currently coached by Jocelyn Barrieau with Hughanna Gaw, Craig McDevitt, Craig Beemer, and Lia Hoyte as assistant coaches. In 2010, the Stingers won the Quebec conference and took home a silver medal from the CIS national championship. The women also advanced to nationals in 2009 and placed fourth. Also in 2009, Hughanna Gaw was named 2009 CIS Rookie of the Year. Several stingers played on the senior national fifteens and sevens team including Josée Lacasse, Micheline Green, Erin Dance, Natascha Wesch, Sheila Turner, Margaret Thompson, Sommer Christie, Bianca Farella, Alex Tessier, and Frédérique Rajotte.

Soccer
The men's and women’s soccer team is under the direction of former Canadian national team goalkeeper Greg Sutton.

Wrestling

Future Olympian Garry Kallos attended Concordia (Bachelor of Applied Science '80), and competed in the 95+ kilo weight class at the Canadian Interuniversity Athletic Union championships, winning a gold medal in 1978 and again in 1984. He was named to the Concordia University Sports Hall of Fame in 2002. Future Olympian Andy Borodow also competed for the school.

Club teams
Baseball
Curling
Cross-country running
Golf
Skiing

Baseball
The baseball club, which operates in the fall season under head coach Howie Schwartz, is composed of mostly elite and AA level players from summer leagues and competes at the club level against other schools in Quebec, Ontario and an array of schools from Atlantic Canada for a national championship in late October. The Cape Breton University Capers won in 2005 and Concordia did not make the playoffs. In 2007, the baseball team won their first conference championship in school history over the University of Ottawa Gee-Gees advancing to their first CIBA National Championships. They lost 2-0 in the championship final against the University of New Brunswick.

In 2008, they lost the Conference Title to the Collège Laflèche Dragons in a three-game series.

In 2009, the Concordia Stingers defeated the University of Ottawa Gee-Gees in two straight games to win the CIBA Northern Conference and advance to the CIBA National Championships for the second time in three years. Despite dropping two of their round robin games, on the final day of the tournament, the team won three straight games to capture its first National Championship. They defeated the OUA Champion Western University Mustangs 6-2 in the tie-breaker for Fourth Place. The Gee-Gees who were in the Nationals as a Wild Card and beat the Stingers for some revenge in the tournament's opening game, were the next victim, as The Stingers won 4-3 with a sixth and seventh inning comeback. In the Championship game, despite going down 1-0 early in the game the Stingers stormed back to win 12-2.

In 2010, the Stingers went 11-5 and finished second to the McGill University Redmen who were 13-3. The Stingers were 3-1 against the Redmen during the regular season. After dropping the Ottawa Gee-Gees in the Semis, the Maroon and Gold defeated McGill in three games in the Finals to capture their second straight Conference Championship. At the Nationals in Windsor, Ontario, the Stingers bowed out in the semi-finals, losing to the Brock University Badgers.

In 2011, the Stingers went 13-3 and finished in first place. In the Semi Finals, the Stingers ousted the Redmen in three games after dropping the first game of the series to their fourth place rival. With the series win, The Stingers clinched a trip to their third consecutive CIBA National Championships, to be held in Moncton, New Brunswick. The Stingers failed in their bid to win a third straight conference title, losing in three games to the Carleton University Ravens.

Cross-country running
A cross-country running team was revived in 2004. The head coach is currently John Lofranco.

Promotions and Dance Team
The Spirit Team was established in 2005, serving as the university's first ever dance/cheer team, performing at football games.

Awards and honors

Athletes of the Year
The Concordia Stingers Female Athlete of the Year is presented with the Sally Kemp Award. The Male Athlete of the Year is bestowed the honour of the Dr. J. Robert Brodrick Award.

See also
U Sports

References

External links
 Concordia Stingers
 Ed Meagher Arena

 
U Sports teams
U Sports teams in Montreal
U Sports teams in Quebec
Sports clubs established in 1974
1974 establishments in Quebec